Osbornia is a monotypic genus of mangrove in the myrtle family Myrtaceae. The sole species is Osbornia octodonta, commonly known as the myrtle mangrove, which inhabits coastal areas of Borneo, the  Philippines, the Lesser Sunda Islands. the Northern Territory, Queensland, and northern Western Australia. It was first described in 1862 by Ferdinand von Mueller, based on material collected in Trinity Bay. who published the description in his tome Fragmenta Phytographiæ Australiæ. It is usually found on the landward side of mangrove forests.

References

External links
 
 
 View a map of historical sightings of this species at the Australasian Virtual Herbarium
 View observations of this species on iNaturalist
 View images of this species on Flickriver
 FloraBase: Osbornia 

Monotypic Myrtaceae genera
Flora of Queensland
Flora of the Northern Territory
Flora of Western Australia
Flora of Malesia
Taxa named by Ferdinand von Mueller
Plants described in 1862